Christopher Henderson (born December 11, 1970) is an American former professional soccer player who played as a midfielder. He earned 79 caps with the U.S. national team and part of the U.S. team at the 1992 Summer Olympics. At the time of his retirement from Major League Soccer, he was the league's all-time leader in games played. Henderson served as the technical director of Seattle Sounders FC from 2008 to 2021. He is the chief soccer officer and sporting director of Inter Miami CF.

Club career

Early career
Henderson, older brother to Sean Henderson, attended Cascade High School in Everett, Washington.  In 1989, he played a single season with the Seattle Storm of the Western Soccer League.

Henderson played two years of college soccer at UCLA, where he helped the team win a national championship his sophomore season. Upon graduating from college, Henderson played for 2. Bundesliga club FSV Frankfurt during the 1994–95 season. He turned down offers from the revived Seattle Sounders and new Seattle SeaDogs to play overseas. After the end of that season, he moved to the Norwegian league, where he trained with Stabæk during the winter. He was inducted into the UCLA Athletics Hall of Fame in 2016.

Major League Soccer
At the end of the Norwegian season, Henderson returned to the U.S. and on March 11, 1996, the Colorado Rapids of Major League Soccer (MLS) named Henderson as a Discovery Player.  He immediately stood out by starting 29 games, scoring three goals and eight assists, and being named the Rapids' team MVP. Henderson spent the next two seasons with the Rapids, registering nine goals and 22 assists over 51 games. He then moved to the Kansas City Wizards for the 1999 season, where he started 29 games, scoring three goals and six assists. Henderson was even better in 2000, scoring nine goals and nine assists as one of the major players in the Wizards team that won the MLS Cup.

He moved to the Miami Fusion for the 2001 season, where he scored three goals and eight assists on a team that went on to win the MLS Supporters' Shield in their final year. Upon Fusion's contraction, Henderson was reacquired by the Rapids in the 2002 MLS Dispersal Draft. Henderson continued to be a threat on the right for the Rapids, scoring 11 goals and seven assists in his first season back. Although he began to show his age in the next two seasons, Henderson continued to be dangerous on the flank. He is the Rapids' all-time leader with 178 games played, 53 assists, and 120 points. Henderson was traded to the Columbus Crew in May 2005 in a three-team deal. After the season, he was dealt again, to the MetroStars — soon renamed New York Red Bulls — for Tim Ward.  Henderson played every match of the 2006 season, and by its end he was the league's all-time leader in games played, though he has since lost the title. At the end of the season, however, Henderson was waived. He went on to announce his retirement from professional soccer on December 22, 2006.

International career

Henderson earned 79 caps with the U.S. national team throughout the 1990s, beginning with a call-up while still at UCLA. He started in a victory over Iceland and quickly established himself on the national team, seeing time in nearly every game leading up to the 1990 FIFA World Cup.  While he was on the U.S. roster at the World Cup – and the tournament's youngest player at 19 – he did not enter any of the three U.S. games.  Henderson was a member of the U.S. team at the 1992 Summer Olympics in Barcelona.

Henderson continued to play with the national team until 1998.  His last game in the 1990s came in a February 25, 1998 loss to Belgium as the U.S. prepared for the 1998 FIFA World Cup.  Despite being a critical part of the national team for years, Henderson did not make the World Cup roster.  Henderson did not earn his next cap until October 25, 2000.  His next, and final cap, came on September 1, 2001. Over his 79-cap national team career, Henderson scored three goals for the United States but never played in a World Cup.

Post-playing career
Following his retirement as a player, Henderson rejoined the Kansas City Wizards as an assistant coach for the 2007 season. On January 24, 2008, it was announced that Henderson would be joining the front office of the Seattle Sounders FC as the technical director. Under Henderson, the Sounders reached the playoffs in 12 consecutive years starting with their expansion season in 2009. They have won four U.S. Open Cups, one Supporters' Shield, and two MLS Cup championships since joining the league.

Henderson was named the chief soccer officer and sporting director of Inter Miami CF on January 18, 2021.

Career statistics

References

1970 births
Living people
American expatriate soccer players in Germany
Colorado Rapids players
Columbus Crew players
1990 FIFA World Cup players
1991 CONCACAF Gold Cup players
Footballers at the 1992 Summer Olympics
1992 King Fahd Cup players
1993 Copa América players
1993 CONCACAF Gold Cup players
1998 CONCACAF Gold Cup players
CONCACAF Gold Cup-winning players
Sporting Kansas City players
Miami Fusion players
Olympic soccer players of the United States
New York Red Bulls players
Seattle Sounders FC
Seattle Storm (soccer) players
Major League Soccer players
Major League Soccer All-Stars
Parade High School All-Americans (boys' soccer)
UCLA Bruins men's soccer players
United States men's international soccer players
Soccer players from Washington (state)
Western Soccer Alliance players
FSV Frankfurt players
2. Bundesliga players
People from Edmonds, Washington
United States men's under-20 international soccer players
United States men's under-23 international soccer players
Association football midfielders
American soccer players
Expatriate footballers in Norway
American expatriate sportspeople in Norway
American expatriate soccer players